Florent Marius Piétrus (born 19 January 1981) is a French professional basketball player, who lastly played for Orléans Loiret Basket of the LNB Pro A. His younger brother, Mickaël Piétrus, played in the National Basketball Association (NBA).

Professional career
Piétrus began his career with the French League club Élan Béarnais Pau-Orthez (1999–04). He went undrafted in the 2003 NBA draft. Since then, he has played in the Spanish League with Unicaja Málaga (2004–07), MMT Estudiantes (2007–08), Valencia (2008–10), Caja Laboral (2010), and again with Valencia (2010–13).

On 22 July 2013 Piétrus signed with the French club SLUC Nancy Basket. He joined the French club BCM Gravelines in 2016. On 1 September 2017 Piétrus signed a short-term deal with Levallois Metropolitans. On 3 February 2018 he signed with Strasbourg IG for the rest of the season. On 9 July 2018 Piétrus signed a one-year contract extension with Strasbourg IG.

On 12 January 2020 he signed with Orléans Loiret Basket of the LNB Pro A.

National team career
In September 2005, Piétrus won the bronze medal at the EuroBasket 2005 with the senior French National Team. He also won the silver medal at the EuroBasket 2011, the gold medal at the EuroBasket 2013, and the bronze medal at the EuroBasket 2015. He also played at EuroBasket 2003, EuroBasket 2007, and EuroBasket 2009.

Piétrus also played with France at the 2006 FIBA World Championship, at the 2010 FIBA World Championship in Turkey, at the 2012 Summer Olympics, at the 2014 FIBA World Cup, where he won a bronze medal, and at the 2016 Summer Olympics.

French national team stats

Personal life
Piétrus is the older brother of Mickaël Piétrus, who played in the NBA. His son Illan is also a basketball player.

References

External links
Euroleague.net Profile
NBA.com Draft Profile
FIBA Archive Profile
Eurobasket.com Profile
Spanish League Profile 
DraftExpress.com Profile
Facebook Profile

1981 births
Living people
2006 FIBA World Championship players
2010 FIBA World Championship players
2014 FIBA Basketball World Cup players
Baloncesto Málaga players
Basketball players at the 2012 Summer Olympics
Basketball players at the 2016 Summer Olympics
BCM Gravelines players
Black French sportspeople
CB Estudiantes players
Élan Béarnais players
French expatriate basketball people in Spain
French men's basketball players
French people of Guadeloupean descent
Guadeloupean men's basketball players
Liga ACB players
Olympic basketball players of France
Metropolitans 92 players
People from Les Abymes
Power forwards (basketball)
Saski Baskonia players
SIG Basket players
SLUC Nancy Basket players
Small forwards
Valencia Basket players